Paleocadmus is a genus of radula known only from the Mazon Creek biota.  It is only known from isolated fossils around a centimetre in length, and a few mm wide (in one instance associated with a possible beak), but its morphology aligns it with the nautiloids, or perhaps the bactritoids or belemnoids.

References

Nautiloids